Weyto is a speculative extinct language thought to have been spoken in the Lake Tana region of Ethiopia by the Weyto, a small group of hippopotamus hunters who now speak Amharic. 

The Weyto language was first mentioned by the Scottish traveler James Bruce, who spoke Amharic. Bruce passed through the area about 1770 and reported that "the Wayto speak a language radically different from any of those in Abyssinia," but was unable to obtain any "certain information" on it, despite prevailing upon the king to send for two Weyto men for him to ask questions, which they would "neither answer nor understand" even when threatened with hanging.  The next European to report on the Weyto, Eugen Mittwoch, described them as uniformly speaking a dialect of Amharic (Mittwoch 1907).  This report was confirmed by Marcel Griaule when he passed through in 1928, although he added that at one point a Weyto sang an unrecorded song "in the dead language of the Wohitos" whose meaning the singer himself did not understand, except for a handful of words for hippopotamus body parts which, he says, had remained in use.  

This Amharic dialect is described by Marcel Cohen (1939) as featuring a fair number of words derived from Amharic roots but twisted in sound or meaning in order to confuse outsiders, making it a sort of argot. In addition, the dialect had a small number of Cushitic loanwords not found in standard Amharic, and a large number of Arabic loanwords mainly related to Islam.  Of the substantial wordlist collected by Griaule, Cohen only considered six terms to be etymologically obscure: šəlkərít "fish-scale", qəntat "wing", čəgəmbit "mosquito", annessa "shoulder", ənkies "hippopotamus thigh", wazəməs "hippopotamus spine."  By 1965, the visiting anthropologist Frederick Gamst found "no surviving native words, not even relating to their hunting and fishing work tasks." (Gamst 1965.)

The paucity of the data available has not prevented speculation on the classification of their original language; Cohen suggested that it might have been either an Agaw language or a non-Amharic Semitic language, while Dimmendaal (1989) says it "probably belonged to Cushitic" (as does Agaw), and Gamst (1965) says "...it can be assumed that if the Wäyto did not speak Amharic 200 years ago, their language must have been Agäw..."  According to the Ethnologue, Bender et al. (1976) saw it as Cushitic, while Bender 1983 saw it as either Eastern Sudanic or Awngi.  It thus effectively remains unclassified, largely for lack of data, but possibly related to Agaw.

References

Sources
 Bender, M. L., J. D. Bowen, C. A. Cooper, and C. A. Ferguson, eds. 1976. Language in Ethiopia. Oxford University Press.
 Bender, M. L., ed. 1983.  Nilo-Saharan language studies. Dallas, Texas: Summer Institute of Linguistics.
 Bruce, James M. 1790.  Travels to Discover the Source of the Nile, 1768-73 (5 vols.)  Edinburgh: G. Robinson & J. Robinson. (vol. iii, p. 403)
 Cohen, Marcel.  Nouvelles Etudes d'Ethiopien Méridional. Paris: Champion.  pp. 358–371.
 Dimmendaal, Gerrit. 1989. "On Language Death in Eastern Africa", in Dorian, Nancy C. (ed.), Investigating obsolescence: Studies in language contraction and death (Studies in the Social and Cultural Foundations of Language 7.)  Cambridge: Cambridge University Press
 Gamst, Frederick.  1965.  Travel and research in northern Ethiopia.  (Notes for Anthropologists and Other Field Workers in Ethiopia 2.)  Addis Ababa Institute for Ethiopian Studies, Haile Selassie I University.
 Gamst, Frederick.  1979.  "Wayto ways: Change from hunting to peasant life", in Hess (ed.), Proceedings of the 5th International Conference on Ethiopian Studies, Session B.  Chicago: University of Illinois at Chicago Circle.
 Gamst, Frederick.  1984.  "Wayto", in Weeks, R. V. (ed.), Muslim peoples: a world ethnographic survey, 2nd edition, (2 vols.)  Westport, CT: Greenwood Press.
 Griaule, Marcel.  Les flambeurs d'hommes.  Paris 1934.
 Mittwoch, Eugen. 1907.  "Proben aus dem amharischen Volksmund", Mittheilungen des Seminars für Orientalische Sprachen zu Berlin 10(2), pp. 185–241.
 Sommer, Gabriele.  "A survey on language death in Africa", in Matthias Brenziger (ed.), Language Death: Factual and Theoretical Explorations with Special Reference to East Africa.  Berlin and New York: Mouton de Gruyter 1992.

Languages of Ethiopia
Extinct languages of Africa
Unattested languages of Africa
Languages extinct in the 19th century